Look What I Did! is a compilation album by American rock musician Joe Walsh, released on May 23, 1995. The 2-CD set contains 34 songs from multiple albums spanning from 1968 through 1993, and offers tracks from both Walsh's solo work and when he recorded with the band James Gang.

Reception

Writing for Allmusic, critic Daevid Jehnzen wrote the album "features almost every worthwhile song the guitarist ever recorded..."

Track listing
All songs written by Joe Walsh except where otherwise indicated.

Disc 1

Disc 2

References 

Joe Walsh albums
1995 compilation albums
MCA Records compilation albums